White Hart Lane Community Sports Centre, also known as the New River Stadium is a rugby league and athletics stadium in Wood Green, Haringey, north London, England that is home to London Skolars rugby league club, Enfield and Haringey Athletic Club, Wood Green Weightlifting Club, Park View F.C., Haringey Rhinos rugby union club and Haringey Cycling Club.

The stadium has hosted the Britbowl, the championship game of British American football, in 2019 and 2022.

The New River Stadium also hosts the Middlesex 9s rugby league nines tournament. The stadium is within walking distance of White Hart Lane football stadium. The grandstand at the ground holds approximately 1,000 people, while the ground itself has a capacity of 5,000.

Transport

Wood Green tube station on the Piccadilly line is the closest station to the stadium which is roughly a 15 minutes walk away. Also Alexandra Palace is a 30 minutes walk away which serves trains to both King's Cross St Pancras and Moorgate. White Hart Lane railway station is also around a 25-minute walk away which serves trains to Liverpool Street.

References

External links 
 New River Stadium on Worldstadia.com
 London Skolars site
 Middlesex Nines website
 Haringey Cycling Club
 Haringey Rhinos Rugby Club
 Hashtag United website
 Next Level Football League youtube channel

Athletics venues in London
Rugby league stadiums in London
Rugby union stadiums in London
Sport in the London Borough of Haringey
Tourist attractions in the London Borough of Haringey
Multi-purpose stadiums in the United Kingdom
London Skolars
Wood Green
Football venues in London
Toronto Wolfpack
American football venues in the United Kingdom